Corwin's Quest is an American wildlife documentary television program that aired on Animal Planet in 2005 and 2006. The show was similar to The Crocodile Hunter and was hosted by actor and conservationist Jeff Corwin from The Jeff Corwin Experience. Music composed by Rich Stubbings.

Episode guide
Episode 1 — The Alligator's Bellow (Sound) Original Air Date: June 15, 2005
 Episode 2 — The Camel's Hump (Extremes)Original Air Date: June 22, 2005
 Episode 3 — The Bear's Hunger (Diet)Original Air Date: June 29, 2005
 Episode 4 — The Crocodile's Element (Locomotion)Original Air Date: July 6, 2005
 Episode 5 — The Chimp's Politics (Teamwork)Original Air Date: July 13, 2005
 Episode 6 — The Sardine's Run (Defense)Original Air Date: August 10, 2005
 Episode 7 — The Elephant's Trunk (Smell)Original Air Date: August 31, 2005
 Episode 8 — The Blue Whale's Tail (Giants)Original Air Date: October 12, 2005
 Episode 9 — The Eagle's View (Sight)Original Air Date: October 21, 2005
 Episode 10 — The Lion's Pounce (Hunters)Original Air Date: October 28, 2005
 Episode 11 — The Puma's Prowess (Survival)Original Air Date: December 4, 2005
 Episode 12 — The Falcon's Swoop (Speed)Original Air Date: January 8, 2006
 Episode 13 — The Shark's Jaws (Attack)Original Air Date: January 15, 2006

Reception
Common Sense Media rated the show 4 out of 5 stars.

References

External links
 
 

Animal Planet original programming
2005 American television series debuts
2006 American television series endings
Television series about birds
Television series about mammals
Television series about reptiles and amphibians